Baarish - When you are in mood for romance is a 2019 Hindi web series developed by Ekta Kapoor for video on demand platform ALTBalaji & ZEE5. The series stars Asha Negi and Sharman Joshi as protagonists and revolves around their completely opposite personalities and explores their lives.

The series is available for streaming on the ALTBalaji app and its associated websites since its release date.

The series was launched on Zee TV on 25 March 2020 as a substitute to the Zee TV shows whose broadcast had to be stopped by the channel due to the COVID-19 pandemic.

Plot
The series revolves around a millionaire Gujarati businessman Anuj (Sharman Joshi) and a Marathi girl Gauravi (Asha Negi) who are two complete strangers hailing from completely different backgrounds.

Anuj quits his studies to take care of his siblings and the family business after the death of his father. He builds his own business empire "Mehta Diamonds" from scratch. He has great respect for all his employees and considers them family. On the other hand, Gauravi grows up in a middle-class family  where education is of prime importance. She works in Mehta Diamonds. Her younger brother Aniket (Vikram Singh Chauhan) is dating Shreya, Anuj's sister. Anuj also has a spoilt brother, Rishi, who looks after sales at Mehta Jewelers. Anuj and Gauravi come close to each other during an exhibition where he saves her from a conspiracy.

Circumstances lead to Anuj and Gauravi's families arranging for them to be married. Gradually, they fall in love.

Cast

Episodes

Season 1

Season 2

References

External links
 Baarish (Season 2) on ALTBalaji

 Baarish(Season 1) on ALTBalaji
 Baarish  on ZEE5

2019 web series debuts
Hindi-language web series
ALTBalaji original programming
Indian drama web series